The pale-edged flycatcher (Myiarchus cephalotes) is a species of bird in the family Tyrannidae.
It is found in Bolivia, Colombia, Ecuador, Peru, and Venezuela.
Its natural habitats are subtropical or tropical moist montane forests and heavily degraded former forest.

References

pale-edged flycatcher
Birds of the Northern Andes
pale-edged flycatcher
pale-edged flycatcher
Taxonomy articles created by Polbot